Minto Landing Aerodrome  is a registered aerodrome located next to Minto on the Yukon River in Yukon, Canada. It is a  turf/gravel strip orientated 09/27.

References 

Registered aerodromes in Yukon